The Rafael A. Mangual Coliseum (Spanish: Coliseo Rafael A. Mangual) is a sports arena in Mayagüez, Puerto Rico. It was inaugurated in 1974 and was designed by Henry Klumb.  The Coliseum is managed by the Physical Education Department of the University of Puerto Rico at Mayaguez.

Events
Many sporting events are held there such as basketball, volleyball and others. Many Academic, Cultural and Business activities are held at the arena, including the University Graduation ceremonies each June, concerts from the Puerto Rico Symphony Orchestra and University Job Fairs.  The boxing events for the 2010 Central American and Caribbean Games were held there.

References

Sports in Mayagüez, Puerto Rico
Buildings and structures in Mayagüez, Puerto Rico
Indoor arenas in Puerto Rico
Basketball venues in Puerto Rico
University of Puerto Rico at Mayagüez
2010 Central American and Caribbean Games venues
Volleyball venues in Puerto Rico
1974 establishments in Puerto Rico
Sports venues completed in 1974
College basketball venues in the United States
College volleyball venues in the United States